State Route 127 (SR 127) is a state highway in the U.S. state of California that connects Interstate 15 in Baker to Nevada State Route 373 at the Nevada state line, passing near the eastern boundary of Death Valley National Park. The entire length of the highway closely follows the central portion of the former Tonopah and Tidewater Railroad and loosely follows the Amargosa River.

Route description

The highway begins at I-15 in the community of Baker, the last town travelers from the Greater Los Angeles area or the Las Vegas Valley see before making their trek across Death Valley. SR 127 travels through the town of Baker as Death Valley Road before turning slightly northwest and traveling along the edge of Silver Lake, a dry lake. The road parallels Salt Creek and Silurian Lake as it crosses the Valjean Valley. SR 127 soon runs along the southeastern edge of Death Valley National Park and cuts through the mountains at Ibex Pass as it is entering Inyo County.

After passing by the turnoff for Tecopa Hot Springs, SR 127 runs concurrently with SR 178 through the community of Shoshone. SR 127 continues along the eastern edge of Death Valley National Park, passing by Eagle Mountain and the Amargosa River before intersecting SR 190 at Death Valley Junction. The road ends at the California-Nevada border, where Nevada State Route 373 begins. It is the "Lost Highway" featured in David Lynch's film Lost Highway.

SR 127 is part of the California Freeway and Expressway System, and near I-15 is part of the National Highway System, a network of highways that are considered essential to the country's economy, defense, and mobility by the Federal Highway Administration. SR 127 is eligible to be included in the State Scenic Highway System, but it is not officially designated as a scenic highway by the California Department of Transportation.

History
In 1933, Route 127 was added to the state highway system, and went from Baker to Death Valley Junction; Route 128 went from there to the Nevada state line. In the 1964 state highway renumbering, SR 127 was defined from I-15 to the Nevada state line. The route has remained the same since its definition.

Major intersections

See also

References

External links

Caltrans: Route 127 highway conditions
California Highways: SR 127
California @ AARoads.com - State Route 127

127
State Route 127
State Route 127
 Death Valley National Park
 Mojave Desert